DeWitt Henry is an American author and editor.

Born in 1941 in Wayne, Pennsylvania, Henry earned his A.B. from Amherst College in 1963 and his MA and PhD from Harvard University. He is a founding editor of Ploughshares, a literary journal, and served as its editor and director from its inception in 1971 to 1995. Henry taught at Emerson College from 1983 until his retirement in 2014.

Bibliography

Works authored
Sweet Marjoram: Notes and Essays, Plume Editions/MadHat Press, 2018
Visions of a Wayne Childhood, Create Space, 2012
Sweet Dreams: A Family History, Hidden River Press, 2011
Safe Suicide: Essays, Narratives, and Mediations, Red Hen Press, 2008 
The Marriage of Anna Maye Potts, University of Tennessee Press, 2001 (winner of the Peter Taylor Prize for the Novel)

Works edited
Sorrow's Company: Writers on Loss and Grief, Beacon Press, 2001
Breaking Into Print: Early Stories and Insights Into Getting Published, Beacon Press, 2000
Fathering Daughters: Reflections by Men (with James Alan McPherson), Beacon Press 1998, pb. 1999
Other Sides of Silence: New Fiction from Ploughshares, Faber and Faber, 1993, o.p.
The Ploughshares Reader: New Fiction for the 80s, Pushcart Press, 1984, NAL, 1985 (winner of the Third Annual Editors Book Award)

References

External links
 dewitthenry.com
 Ploughshares
 Interview with the author at Pif Magazine.

Living people
American male writers
American editors
Emerson College faculty
Amherst College alumni
Harvard University alumni
1941 births